NGC 7098 is a doubled barred spiral galaxy located about 95 million light-years away from Earth in the constellation of Octans. NGC 7098 has an estimated diameter of 152,400 light-years. NGC 7098 was discovered by astronomer John Herschel on September 22, 1835.

Characteristics 
NGC 7098 has a very prominent bar that is shaped like a broad oval with very prominent, nearly straight ansae. Surrounding the bar, an inner ring made of four tightly wrapped spiral arms is found. Located outside of the inner ring, a well-defined outer ring surrounding the inner region appears to have formed due to the wrapping of two spiral arms. It appears that both rings are being affected by new star formation. However, there is no star formation in the core of NGC 7098 as shown by the absence of dust lanes.

See also 
 NGC 7013
 NGC 7020

References

External links 

 SIMBAD
 NGC 70-- Project

Ring galaxies
Barred spiral galaxies
Octans
7098
67266
Astronomical objects discovered in 1835